Ruvarashe Christabel Chinyemba (born 6 March 1992) is a former Zimbabwean woman cricketer. She represented Zimbabwe in the 2008 Women's Cricket World Cup Qualifier.

References 

1992 births
Living people
Zimbabwean women cricketers
Sportspeople from Harare